Ahlin (also Åhlin) is a Swedish surname. People with the name include:

 Cvetka Ahlin (1927–1985), Slovenian opera singer
 Harry Ahlin (1900–1969), Swedish film actor
 Karin Åhlin (1830-1899), Swedish educator
 Lars Ahlin (1915–1997), Swedish author and aesthetician
 Lennart Ahlin (1916–1995), Swedish sports shooter
 Per Åhlin (born 1931), Swedish artist and director of animated films
 Rudy Ahlin (1914–1976), American ice hockey player
 Tina Ahlin (born 1967), Swedish composer, pianist and singer
 Urban Ahlin (born 1964), Swedish Social Democratic Party politician

Surnames of Swedish origin